Guloien is a surname. Notable people with the surname include:

Donald Guloien, Canadian business executive
Krista Guloien (born 1980), Canadian rower